XHRRR-FM is a radio station in Papantla de Olarte, Veracruz. Owned by Radiorama, XHRRR broadcasts on 89.3 MHz from a tower on Cerro El Comanche and is known as @FM.

The station began its life as XEPV-AM 1270, with a concession awarded to Andrés Ebergenyi Belgodere in September 1957. In the 1980s, the station became XERRR-AM; its sister station on 1170 (now XHPV-FM), which had been XEEU, took on the XEPV calls.

The station migrated to FM in the early 2010s. It is one of two stations with the XHRRR callsign; the other is located in Encarnación de Díaz, Jalisco.

References

Radio stations in Veracruz